FQL may refer to:

 Facebook Query Language
 Faqirwali railway station, in Pakistan